This is a list of medalists from the ICF Canoe Slalom World Championships in men's canoe.

C1
Debuted: 1949.

Medal table

C1 team
Debuted: 1949.

Medal table

C2
Debuted: 1949. Discontinued: 2017.

Medal table

C2 team
Debuted: 1949. Discontinued: 2017. Not counted as a medal event due to insufficient number of participating countries in 2005 and 2017.

Medal table

References
World Championship results archive